Global affairs usually refers to International relations; the scientific study of the international connections between states. 

Global affairs or Global Affair may refer to:

A Global Affair, 1964 comedy film
 Global Affairs Canada, Canadian government department that manages Canada's diplomatic and consular relations

See also
Canadian Global Affairs Institute, an independent research institute based in Calgary
Chicago Council on Global Affairs, a global affairs think tank
Jackson Institute for Global Affairs, Yale University
Munk School of Global Affairs, University of Toronto